William F. Arnemann (October 14, 1850 – December 10, 1917) was a German-born American businessman and politician who served as a member of the Wisconsin State Assembly.

Background 
Born in Hanover, Germany, Arnemann emigrated with his parents at age five and settled in West Bend, Wisconsin. In 1870, Arnemann started a soda water factory in Neenah, Wisconsin and was also in the ice business. He married Mary Bruening in 1872, with whom he had 10 children. Bruening was killed by a train in 1916.

Arnemann served on the Neenah Common Council and was mayor of Neenah. He also served on the Winnebago County, Wisconsin Board of Supervisors. Arnemann was a Democrat. He served in the Wisconsin State Assembly in 1903 and from 1915 until his death in 1917.

Arnemann died of heart failure in Neenah, Wisconsin.

Notes

External links

1850 births
1917 deaths
Hanoverian emigrants to the United States
Politicians from Neenah, Wisconsin
People from West Bend, Wisconsin
Businesspeople from Wisconsin
Wisconsin city council members
Mayors of places in Wisconsin
County supervisors in Wisconsin
19th-century American politicians
Burials in Wisconsin
19th-century American businesspeople
Democratic Party members of the Wisconsin State Assembly